Kris Sparre (born January 12, 1987) is a Canadian-German retired professional ice hockey player. He is currently a professional ice hockey coach with the Anaheim Ducks farm team San Diego Gulls

Sparre played major junior hockey with the Barrie Colts and Mississauga St. Michael's Majors in the Ontario Hockey League before joining the Columbia Inferno of the ECHL towards the end of the 2007-08 ECHL season. He then spent a season with the Idaho Steelheads, playing 56 regular season games and scoring 16 goals. In 2009, Sparre moved to Germany and signed for the Iserlohn Roosters of the Deutsche Eishockey Liga. He would also play for ERC Ingolstadt, Eisbären Berlin and Düsseldorfer EG, as well as stints in DEL2 with Dresdner Eislöwen and Löwen Frankfurt before retiring in 2016.

Career statistics

References

External links

1987 births
Living people
Barrie Colts players
Canadian ice hockey left wingers
Columbia Inferno players
Dresdner Eislöwen players
Düsseldorfer EG players
Eisbären Berlin players
ERC Ingolstadt players
Halifax Mooseheads players
Ice hockey people from Ontario
Idaho Steelheads (ECHL) players
Iserlohn Roosters players
Löwen Frankfurt players
Sportspeople from Mississauga
Mississauga St. Michael's Majors players
Canadian expatriate ice hockey players in Germany